Marie is an American comedy-variety limited series hosted by and starring singer-actress Marie Osmond that aired on NBC from December 12, 1980 to September 26, 1981 with a total of seven episodes, split across two abbreviated seasons.

Overview
Fred Silverman, then the President of NBC, had attempted to replicate the success of the 1976–79 variety show Donny & Marie (which Silverman had commissioned while at ABC) when he green-lit Pink Lady and Jeff earlier in 1980. That show proved to be an all-around disaster and was canceled after only five episodes.

The Osmond family was in a lull in their career in 1979 after the cancellation of Donny & Marie, with their 1979 album Steppin' Out being a commercial failure and star Donny Osmond distancing himself from the family. Marie had starred in an unsold pilot Marie With the Osmonds in debt from their investment into Donny & Marie, and with Silverman in need of an established hit, Marie Osmond returned to variety television in December 1980 and headlined her own show on NBC in an attempt to repeat the success of her earlier variety series. She was contracted to do seven shows for NBC.

The new show showcased Osmond's singing, acting and comedic talents in the same format of a traditional variety series (similar to Donny & Marie) which featured musical numbers, comedy sketches and various guest stars each week. Guest stars included TV personalities and musical artists such as Gavin MacLeod, Jeff Conaway, Tony Orlando, The Pointer Sisters, Andy Williams, Scott Baio, Sally Struthers, David Copperfield, Nell Carter, Bob Hope, The Commodores and Andy Gibb. Noticeably absent on-camera were Marie's brothers; of them, only Jimmy Osmond appeared on the show as a guest in one episode, though Donny Osmond appeared as a surprise during the closing number of the premiere episode to tell Marie he thought she was great and had a winner. (Alan and Jay were listed as executive producers.)

Episode list

Broadcast history
NBC ordered seven episodes of Marie, which aired in two batches. The first four episodes aired weekly from December 12, 1980 through January 2, 1981.  The remaining three episodes aired in September 1981, again airing weekly. The series was produced by the Osmond family's production company, Osmond Productions.

See also 
 The Talk

References
 Brooks, Tim and Marsh, Earle, The Complete Directory to Prime Time Network and Cable TV Shows 1946–Present

Notes

External links
 

1980 American television series debuts
1981 American television series endings
1980s American sketch comedy television series
1980s American variety television series
1980s American musical comedy television series
NBC original programming
English-language television shows